Chinnanchiru Ulagam is a 1966 Indian Tamil-language comedy film written, produced and directed by K. S. Gopalakrishnan. The film stars Gemini Ganesan, K. R. Vijaya, Nagesh, Magic Radhika and V. K. Ramasamy. It is based on the Subbu Arumugam novel Manithanai Kaanom. Chinnanchiru Ulagam was released on 2 September 1966 and became a commercial success.

Plot

Cast 
 Gemini Ganesan
 K. R. Vijaya
 Nagesh
 V. K. Ramasamy
 Magic Radhika
 G. Sakunthala
 M. S. Sundari Bai
Radhabhai
O. A. K. Thevar

Production 
Chinnanchiru Ulagam is based on Subbu Arumugam's novel Manithanai Kaanom. The film was produced and directed by K. S. Gopalakrishnan under Chitra Productions; Gopalakrishnan also wrote the screenplay. Arumugam wrote the comedy subplot of the film. Cinematography was handled by R. Sampath, and the editing by R. Devarajan.

Soundtrack 
The soundtrack was composed by K. V. Mahadevan, and the lyrics were written by Vaali.

Release and reception 
Chinnanchiru Ulagam was released on 2 September 1966, and was distributed by Shanti Pictures. Writing for Film World, V. Gopalakrishnan praised Ganesan for showing "his mettle as a versatile actor" in Chinnanchiru Ulagam. Nagesh's dialogues became popular. Despite facing competition from Thanippiravi, Saraswathi Sabatham and Thenmazhai, all released in the same month, the film became a commercial success, and ran well particularly at the Madurai-based Thangam Theatre, which was once considered Asia's largest theatre.

References

External links 
 

1960s Tamil-language films
1966 comedy films
1966 films
Films based on Indian novels
Films directed by K. S. Gopalakrishnan
Films scored by K. V. Mahadevan
Films with screenplays by K. S. Gopalakrishnan
Indian comedy films